The 2020–21 Bangladesh Premier League was the 13th season of the Bangladesh Premier League since its establishment in 2007. A total of 13 football clubs are competing  in the league. The country's top-flight football competition, Bangladesh Premier League 2020–21 season is kicked off on January 13 after 10 months.

previous season was abandoned due to COVID-19 pandemic in Bangladesh. Bashundhara Kings are the defending champions as 2018–19 season winner.

Teams

Changes

Stadiums and locations

Additional venues
Bangladesh Football Federation had stopped organizing matches outside the capital due to a nationwide lockdown due to the rapid rise in COVID-19 cases. From the twentieth round, Bir Sherestha Shaheed Shipahi Mostafa Kamal Stadium and from the twenty-first round, Bangladesh Army Stadium began to be used as the venue of the league to reduce the pressure on the Bangabandhu National Stadium.

Personnel and kits

Head coaching changes

Foreign players

Bold names refer to international players who have already played or are still playing.
Note :: players who released during summer transfer window;: players who registered during summer transfer window.

League table

Results

Positions by round
The following table lists the positions of teams after each week of matches. In order to preserve the chronological evolution, any postponed matches are not included to the round at which they were originally scheduled but added to the full round they were played immediately afterward.

Season statistics

Goalscorers

Own goals 
† Bold Club indicates winner of the match

Hat-tricks 

4  Player scored 4 goals.

Most Assists

Goalkeeping

Notes
Clean sheet is counted for not conceding a goal whilst on the pitch and playing at least 60 minutes (excluding stoppage time).

Discipline

Player 

 Most yellow cards: 9
 Otabek Valijonov (Sheikh Jamal DC)

 Most red cards: 1
 Jewel Rana (Abahani Ltd. Dhaka)
 Faisal Mahmood (Brothers Union)
 Tariq Kazi (Bashundhara Kings)
 Yeasin Khan (Bashundhara Kings)
 Monjurur Rahman Manik (Chittagong Abahani)
 Rakib Hossain (Chittagong Abahani)
 Mehedi Hasan Mithu (Muktijoddha Sangsad KC)
 Mohammad Sujon (Mohammedan SC)
 Russel Mahmud Liton (Rahmatganj MFS)
 Solomon King Kanform (Sheikh Jamal DC)
 Suleiman Sillah (Sheikh Jamal DC)
Otabek Valijonov (Sheikh Jamal DC)
 Faysal Ahmed (Sheikh Jamal DC) 
 Khurshed Beknazarov (Rahmatganj MFS)

Club 

 Most yellow cards:

 Most red cards:

Awards

References

Bangladesh
1
Bangladesh Football Premier League seasons
2021 in Bangladeshi football